Pierre Grillet (21 March 1932 – 10 January 2018) was a French football striker.

References

Profile

1932 births
2018 deaths
French footballers
France international footballers
Racing Club de France Football players
FC Nantes players
Ligue 1 players
Ligue 2 players
Association football forwards
Sportspeople from Vaucluse